MV Free Enterprise III was a Ro-Pax vessel built in 1966 as a cross-channel ferry, operated by Townsend Thoresen mainly on the Calais and Zeebrugge routes from Dover. She was sold to Egyptian owners in 1986 and wrecked in the Red Sea in 2004.

History

Townsend Brothers
Free Enterprise III was built in 1966 by I.C.H. Holland, Werf Gusto Yard, Schiedam, Netherlands, for Townsend Brothers Ferries. In 1968, the company became European Ferries, continuing to operate services as Townsend Thoresen.

Isle of Man Steam Packet Company
In 1984, Free Enterprise III was sold to Maltese owners, Mira Shipping Line, Valletta, and renamed Tamira. She returned to UK  waters later the same year when she was purchased by the Isle of Man Steam Packet Company. Renamed Mona's Isle, the sixth vessel in the company's history to bear the name, she entered service following alterations which saw additional accommodation added. Her service life saw her plying on the company's main Douglas - Heysham schedule with her service commencing in April 1985. However her short-comings were quickly identified. Numerous problems persisted, not least in docking the vessel which required the services of the Laxey Towing Company. Her time in Steam Packet service was brief and the Mona's Isle was laid up in October 1985.

Sadaka Shipping
She was sold again in April 1986, to Egyptian owners, Sadaka Shipping, who renamed her Al Fahad. She served in Saudi Arabia for another twelve years. Suffering engine problems in June 2004, she anchored in the Red Sea and was subsequently abandoned as a wreck 35 km south of Jeddah.

The wreck has subsequently become popular as a scuba dive site with the remains of the ship within 200 metres of the shoreline.

Service
Free Enterprise III  operated on the Dover-Calais service, adding Dover-Zeebrugge from 1967. During the summer of 1974, she spent time on the Cairnryan-Larne route. In summer 1981, Free Enterprise III operated between Portsmouth and Cherbourg.

See also
List of shipwrecks

References

Notes

Bibliography

External links
Free Enterprise III shipwreck on Wikimapia

Ferries of the Isle of Man
1966 ships
Ships built in Schiedam
Shipwrecks in the Red Sea